The women's 100m Butterfly event at the 2006 Central American and Caribbean Games occurred on Wednesday, Saturday 22, 2006 at the S.U. Pedro de Heredia Aquatic Complex in Cartagena, Colombia.

Records at the time of the event were:
World Record: 56.61, Inge de Bruijn (Netherlands), Sydney, Australia, September 17, 2000.
Games Record: 1:03.01, Siobhan Cropper (Trinidad & Tobago), 1998 Games in Maracaibo (Sep.12.1998).

Results

Final

Preliminaries

References

Results: 2006 CACs--Swimming: Women's 100 Butterfly--prelims from the official website of the 2006 Central American and Caribbean Games; retrieved 2009-07-10.
Results: 2006 CACs--Swimming: Women's 100 Butterfly--finals from the official website of the 2006 Central American and Caribbean Games; retrieved 2009-07-10.

Butterfly, Women's 100m
2006 in women's swimming